Torama (alternative name in ) is a music group from Saransk, Mordovia in Russia, performing traditional songs and music of Mordvin ethnic groups, namely Erzya, Moksha, Shoksha, and Qaratay.

History 
Created in 1990 by 4 researchers of Mordvin language and traditions across the USSR, Torama was originally a choir of 9 men. Eventually, Vladimir Romashkin, a researcher and documentary film maker, emerged as the group's frontman. Eager to communicate in Russian and Erzya with audience, he made extensive introductions into every song and dance tune, traditions and rituals of Mordvin peoples, that became integral parts of each performance. 

The ensemble enjoyed popularity both locally (receiving the State Prize of the Republic) and on Moscow level (receiving in 1994 the Gold Medal and the Grand Prix of All-Russian Traditional Music Contest "Voices of Russia"), as well as in Finno-Ugric cultural events in Finland, Estonia etc. Its Finno-Ugric ties eventually brought forward the Latinized spelling of the group's name via "oo" for long "o" instead of single "o" used in its Russian name Torama. 

The group appeared at traditional music and jazz+traditional music festivals in Estonia, Latvia, Poland, Sweden, and UK. 

After several years, their repertoire evolved to include a richer instrumental part, made possible with reconstruction of extinct Mordvin instruments such as garzi violin. In 2002, the instrumental compositions became an important part of each performance and evolved into a separate direction of the group's activity. 

In 2002, Vladimir Romashkin died. In his memory, a memorial museum was opened in his native village of Podlesnaya Tavla. 

The group, while dropping its activity rate for several years, remained and continued its work, staying the standalone Mordvin traditional ensemble with the longest discography. 

In 2007, a new animated movie Kuigorozh (upon a Mordvin tale) by Pilot Animation Studio in Moscow was released, making use of extensive consultations on Erzya and Moksha folklore with group's management and the group's music as a soundtrack.

Discography 
 1996 Toorama — Mordvin Songs — Songs from Erzya Mordvin. MIPUCD 502, 1996. Traditional Erzya songs (recorded and released in Finland)
 2000 Toorama — Taga Eriaza Shkai! (in Erzyan language, recorded and issued in Estonia by Eesti erza-moksha söprade selts, Estonian Erzya-Moksha Friendship Association)
 2001 MeNaiset & Toorama — Mastorava (an Erzya and Finnish language album in collaboration with Finnish female 8-piece choir MeNaiset (collaboration on compositions 8-12, recorded in Leonora Hall at the Kallio-Kuninkala Course Center of the Sibelius Academy in January 1997.); MMCD1; Label: Sterns.
 2002 Toorama — Godspeed (recording: Kallio_Kuninkala, Javenpaa, Finland, IV/1996; recording & mixing: Jouko Kyhala; mastering: Finnvox/Pauli Saastamoinen; produced by Toorama in Moscow and Saransk, in Russia)
2018 Catch Up the Time

Cultural contribution

Polyphonic singing 
Finno-Ugric singing tradition is most often described as bivocal, with 2 vocal lines developed in a choir. Toorama musicians insisted on development of a melodic line for each member, as 2 melodic lines were thought to be a simplification of actual tradition.

Instrumental performance 
While choir singing is widely represented across villages of Mordvins and in Saransk, the living instrumental ensemble performance was practically extinct to the point when Toorama started its reconstruction work and developed the instruments anew.

External links 
 Torama official site 

Mordvin music
Musical groups established in 1990
Russian world music groups
Russian choirs